This is a list of various species of marine invertebrates, animals without a backbone, that are commonly found in aquariums kept by hobby aquarists. Some species are intentionally collected for their desirable aesthetic characteristics. Others are kept to serve a functional role such as consuming algae in the aquarium. Some species are present only incidentally or are pest species.

Annelids

Arthropods

Cheliceratas

Crustaceans

Corals

Corallimorphs

Hydrocorals

Large-polyp stony

Small-polyp stony

Soft corals

Zoanthids

Echinoderms

Sea cucumbers

Starfish

Crinoids

Urchins

Jellyfish

Mollusks

Bivalves

Gastropods

Cephalopods

Sea anemones

Sponges

Tunicates

See also
List of marine aquarium fish species
List of marine aquarium plant species
List of freshwater aquarium invertebrate species
List of brackish aquarium invertebrate species
Marine aquarium
Reef aquarium

References

 Alderton, David (2005). Encyclopedia of Aquarium and Pond Fish (Second ed.). DK Publishing, Inc. pp. 286–297. .
 Lougher, Tristan (2008) [First Published 2007]. What Invertebrates?: A Buyer's Guide for Marine Aquariums. What Pet? Books Series. Barron's Educational Series, Inc. . LCCN 2006933016.

Fishkeeping
Lists of invertebrates
Aquarium invertebrate species
Marine aquarium invertebrates
marine invertebrate